A special election was held in  to fill a vacancy caused by the resignation of William Pinkney (P) due to questions of ineligibility due to his residence

Election results

See also
List of special elections to the United States House of Representatives

References

Maryland 1791 03
Maryland 1791 03
1791 03
Maryland 03
United States House of Representatives
United States House of Representatives 1791 03